Banahao may refer to:

 , a United States Lighthouse Service tender
 Mount Banahaw, a mountain in the Philippines